The 2016–17 Danish 1st Division season is the 21st season of the Danish 1st Division league championship, governed by the Danish Football Association.

The division-champion, the runners-up and the third placed team are promoted to the 2017–18 Danish Superliga The teams in 11th and 12th places are relegated to the 2017–18 Danish 2nd Divisions.

Participants
Hobro IK finished the 2015–16 season of the Superliga in 12th place and was relegated to the 1st Division. Lyngby Boldklub, Silkeborg IF, and AC Horsens were promoted to the 2016–17 Danish Superliga as the Danish Superliga expands to 14 teams for the 2016–17 season.

AB Gladsaxe, Fremad Amager and Nykøbing FC won promotion from the 2015–16 Danish 2nd Divisions.

Stadia and locations

Personnel and sponsoring 
Note: Flags indicate national team as has been defined under FIFA eligibility rules. Players and Managers may hold more than one non-FIFA nationality.

Managerial changes

League table

References

External links
  Danish FA

2
Denmark
Danish 1st Division seasons
2016–17 in Danish football leagues